Enfield South is a former locality in the suburb of  Croydon Park in the Inner West Sydney, New South Wales, Australia. Enfield South is designated as a neighbourhood by the NSW Geographical Names Board.

Commercial area
The Enfield South neighbourhood is bounded by Mitchell Street to the north, Coronation Parade to the west, Georges River Road to the south, and Burwood Road to the east. The Enfield South post office is located on Tangarra Street. Tangarra Street also features an Italian restaurant, cafe, newsagent, and convenience store. On the corner of Tangarra Street and Coronation Parade is a chemist and other shops.

A Burwood Council works depot and the Enfield Flower Power store are located in the Enfield South neighbourhood.

References

External links
 Burwood Council - Local History
 Burwood Council - Enfield Swimming Centre
 Department of Local Councils - Burwood Council Borders & Suburbs
 Enfield Veterinary Hospital - Welcome
 Enfield South Post Office - Information

Maps 
Google Maps - Enfield South Street and Satellite Hybrid

Sydney localities
Municipality of Burwood